Brower's Spring is a spring in the Centennial Mountains of Beaverhead County, Montana that was marked by a surveyor in 1888 as the ultimate headwaters of the Missouri River and thus the fourth longest river in the world, the  Mississippi-Missouri River.

The spring is named for Jacob V. Brower who in 1896 declared it to be the source of the Missouri in his book published by the Pioneer Press titled  The Missouri river and its utmost source.  He visited the site in 1895 and buried a copper plate upon which the name of the river and the date were engraved.

The spring is  further than the spot Meriwether Lewis reported in 1805 as the source of the river above Lemhi Pass on Trail Creek. Both sources are near the Continental Divide in Montana.

It is commemorated by a rock pile. Hell Roaring Creek flows west into the Red Rock River, which flows through Upper, then Lower Red Rock Lakes, west through Lima Reservoir, and then northwest into Clark Canyon Reservoir. From Clark Canyon Reservoir the Beaverhead River flows northeast to join the Big Hole River, forming the Jefferson River, which with the Madison and Gallatin Rivers form the Missouri at Missouri River Headwaters State Park at Three Forks, Montana.

Brower's Spring is not listed as an official name on the Geographic Names Information System maintained by USGS.

References

Landforms of Beaverhead County, Montana
Springs of Montana
Missouri River
Tributaries of the Beaverhead River